Raisa Aleksandrovna Musina (born March 31, 1998) is a Russian basketball player for UMMC Ekaterinburg and the Russian national team. She participated at the EuroBasket Women 2017.

References

1998 births
Living people
Basketball players from Moscow
Phoenix Mercury draft picks
Power forwards (basketball)
Russian expatriate basketball people in Poland
Russian women's basketball players